Josue Tamen Medrano Ngathie (born 28 March 1996) is a Cameroonian professional footballer who currently plays as a midfielder for Ivorian club F.C. Mouna Akoupe.

Career
Tamen began his Junior career with PMUC Douala. In 2006, he transferred to Cotonsport Garoua, where he played until 2008.

Despite his young age, Tamen's unique play style saw him through into division one side, Tiko United, where his fantastic season opened up for international opportunities with Sunshine Stars F.C of Nigeria.

References

External links
Profile and Pictures - www.cotonsport.com
FIFA

1986 births
Living people
Cameroonian footballers
Coton Sport FC de Garoua players
Association football midfielders